Saskatoon/Banga International Air Aerodrome , formerly the Saskatoon/Corman Air Park, is located  south-east of Saskatoon, Saskatchewan, Canada.

The airport is home to the Light Flight Flying Club. The club owns three aircraft, two ultra-light Husky Norseman and one Piel Super Emeraude. The Norseman were locally built at the airport in 1988 while the Emeraude is a kit aircraft.

The airport also hosts the CAVOK Ultralight Flight School.

See also 
 List of airports in Saskatchewan
 Saskatoon John G. Diefenbaker International Airport
 Saskatoon (Jim Pattison Children's Hospital) Heliport

References

External links
 Page about this aerodrome in COPA's Places to Fly airport directory

Registered aerodromes in Saskatchewan
Corman Park No. 344, Saskatchewan